Cubiceps is a genus of driftfishes found circumglobally.

Species
There are currently 10 recognized species in this genus:
 Cubiceps baxteri McCulloch, 1923 (Black fathead)
 Cubiceps caeruleus Regan, 1914 (Blue fathead)
 Cubiceps capensis (A. Smith, 1845) (Cape fathead)
 Cubiceps gracilis (R. T. Lowe, 1843) (Driftfish)
 Cubiceps kotlyari Agafonova, 1988 (Kotlyar's cubehead)
 Cubiceps macrolepis Agafonova, 1988 (Large-scale cigarfish)
 Cubiceps nanus Agafonova, 1988 (Dwarf cigarfish)
 Cubiceps paradoxus J. L. Butler, 1979 (Longfin cigarfish)
 Cubiceps pauciradiatus Günther, 1872 (Longfin fathead)
 Cubiceps whiteleggii (Waite, 1894) (Shadow driftfish)

References 

Nomeidae
Extant Pliocene first appearances